This is a list of Korean inventions and discoveries; Koreans have made contributions to science and technology from ancient to modern times. In the present, South Korea plays an active role in the ongoing Digital Revolution, with one of the largest electronics industries and most innovative economies in the world.

Agriculture
 Soybean cultivation
 The first unambiguously domesticated, cultigen-sized soybean was discovered in Korea at the Mumun-period Daundong site.
 Heated greenhouse
 The first description of a heated greenhouse is from the Sanga Yorok, a treatise on husbandry compiled by a royal physician of the Joseon dynasty of Korea during the 1450s, in its chapter on cultivating vegetables during winter. The treatise contains detailed instructions on constructing a greenhouse that is capable of cultivating vegetables, forcing flowers, and ripening fruit within an artificially heated environment, by utilizing ondol, the traditional Korean underfloor heating system, to maintain heat and humidity; cob walls to insulate heat; and semi-transparent oiled hanji windows to permit light penetration for plant growth and provide protection from the outside environment. The Annals of the Joseon Dynasty confirm that greenhouse-like structures incorporating ondol were constructed to provide heat for mandarin orange trees during the winter of 1438.
 Rain gauge
 The first standardized rain gauge, called the cheugugi, was invented during the reign of Sejong the Great in the Joseon dynasty of Korea. The cheugugi was used throughout the country for official purposes. In the 15th century, Korea was the only country to use a quantitative measuring device for the purpose of meteorological observation.
 Korean hand plow
 The homi, which dates back to the Bronze Age, is one of the most representative agricultural tools of Korea. Its signature tapered blade was developed during the Later Silla period. In recent times, the homi (known by names such as the "Ho-Mi EZ Digger" and "Korean hand plow") has gained popularity in the West.

Aquaculture

Fishing net
 Limestone net sinkers discovered in Korea dating to 27,000 BC are the earliest evidence of fishing by nets and also the oldest fishing implements found to date in the world.
Whaling
 The earliest depictions of whaling have been discovered in Korea at the Neolithic Bangudae site, which may date back to 6000 BC. Bangudae is the earliest evidence for whaling.
Seaweed farming
 The earliest cultivation of gim, an edible seaweed, was started by Kim Yeo-ik in the middle of the 17th century.
Pollock farming
 In 2016, the National Institute of Fisheries Science of South Korea succeeded in farming Alaska pollock for the first time in the world, allowing the fish to lay eggs a year and 8 months after birth, as opposed to 3 years in the wild. Alaska pollock is considered the "national fish" of Korea and is prepared in a number of dishes, including myeongnan-jeot, which was introduced and popularized in Japan as "mentaiko" in the 20th century.

Architecture

 Underfloor heating
 One of the earliest systems of underfloor heating, dating back 2,500 years, was invented and widely used by Koreans. The Korean ondol heating system was thought to be the oldest of its kind until the recent archaeological discovery of a similar heating system in the Alaskan Aleutian Islands. However, the archaeologist who discovered it agrees with Korean researchers that the two systems developed independently, based on the distance of 5,000 kilometers and the absence of ondol in the areas between them. Some Korean researchers have explained this phenomenon by hypothesizing that a whale-hunting people from the Korean Peninsula migrated by sea to Alaska during prehistoric times. Inspired by the Korean ondol hydronic radiant floor heating system, the American architect Frank Lloyd Wright developed and introduced the first "radiant heating system" using hot water pipes. 
 Refrigeration
 The ancient Silla kingdom created an early refrigeration system called seokbinggo, which were subterranean chambers used to store ice and food.
Korean fortress
 Koreans developed a unique and distinct fortress tradition. Korean fortresses were based on a stone culture and built with stones on natural mountainous terrain; therefore, they are conceptually completely different compared to Chinese fortresses, which were based on an earth culture and built with bricks and stamped earth on flat land. Korean fortresses were invented by Goguryeo and spread to Baekje and Silla, and then inherited and further developed by Goryeo and then Joseon. Goguryeo fortress ruins have been found in about 170 sites to date, including in China; one of the most notable among them is Ansi Fortress, which successfully defended against Tang Taizong during the Goguryeo–Tang War. Korea, beginning with Goguryeo, has been called "a country of fortresses"; almost 2,400 mountain fortress sites have been found in Korea. Korean-style fortresses can also be found in Japan, which were constructed and supervised by immigrants of Baekje origin.
Korean pagoda
 Koreans created a unique and distinct pagoda tradition using stone. Pagodas were created in India using earth, then in China using wood, which spread to the Three Kingdoms of Korea, and then Japan; however, the pagoda tradition of East Asia diverged, with China creating pagodas using bricks, Korea creating pagodas using stone, and Japan continuing to use wood. Korean stone pagodas were first created in Baekje during the early 7th century and then inherited by Later Silla; 90% of the pagodas in Later Silla were made of stone. The stone pagoda tradition was propagated by the great abundance of high quality granite in Korea, which also led to other granite creations such as the Seokguram and Cheomseongdae. Goryeo, a devoutly Buddhist state, also inherited the stone pagoda tradition.

Astronomy
Star chart
 The earliest known constellation patterns in Korea can be found on dolmens dating back to 3000 BC. The Cheonsang Yeolcha Bunyajido is a planisphere inscribed on black marble that was completed in 1395 during the reign of King Taejo; according to its inscription, it is based on a star chart from ancient Goguryeo that was lost during wartime. It is known as the world’s second oldest star chart engraved in stone, after the Chinese Suzhou Star Chart of 1247. However, the Cheonsang Yeolcha Bunyajido's stellar positions indicate an epoch dating back to the first century AD, thus making it the oldest actual representation of the stars in the world.
Astronomical observatory
 The Cheomseongdae is the oldest surviving astronomical observatory in Asia, and possibly the world. It was constructed in Seorabeol, the capital of Silla, during the reign of Queen Seondeok in the 7th century. Modeled on Baekje's Jeomseongdae, which now exists only in historical records, the Cheomseongdae influenced the construction of a Japanese observatory in 675, and Duke Zhou's observatory in China in 723.

Mathematics

Latin square
 The first literature on the Latin square dates back to the monograph Gusuryak by the Joseon mathematician Choi Seok-jeong (1646–1715), predating Leonhard Euler by at least 67 years.
Hexagonal tortoise problem
 The hexagonal tortoise problem was invented by Choi Seok-jeong during the Joseon period.
Ree group
 The Korean mathematician Rimhak Ree discovered and constructed the Ree group in the mathematical field of group theory.
Chisanbop
 Chisanbop is an abacus-like calculation system using fingers that was invented in Korea in the 1940s and brought to the West in the 1970s.

Writing

 Featural writing system
 Hangul is the world's first featural writing system, wherein the shapes of the letters are not arbitrary, but encode phonological features of the phonemes they represent. The Korean alphabet is unique among the world's writing systems, in that it combines aspects of featural, phonemic, and syllabic representation. Hangul, originally named Hunminjeongeum, was personally created by Sejong the Great to promote literacy among the common people.
Phonemic orthography
 Predating the creation of Hangul by hundreds of years, Koreans created various phonetic writing systems that were used in conjunction with Hanja, including idu, hyangchal, gugyeol, and gakpil. Some of them may have influenced the development of kana in Japan.

Printing

 Movable type
 Movable metal type was invented in Korea in the early thirteenth century, predating Gutenberg's invention in Europe by two centuries and advancing the movable type technology developed in the Song dynasty of China. The first book to be printed with movable metal type is the Prescribed Ritual Texts of the Past and Present in 1234 during the Goryeo period. The earliest surviving book to be printed with movable metal type is the Jikji, dated to 1377. The first lead type in the world is the Byeongjinja created in 1436. Metal types were called juja (cast characters), and the Joseon government operated the jujaso bureau, a continuation of Goryeo's seojeogwon, to print books and documents to be distributed to the central and local administrations, village schools, scholars, and officials.
 Newspaper
 The Jobo, which is discussed in the Annals of the Joseon Dynasty, is possibly the oldest newspaper in the world. Published in 1577, the Jobo was a privately run commercial newspaper, printed daily, that covered a range of topics, including weather, constellations, and current affairs. In 2017, a Korean monk claimed to have discovered an extant copy of the Jobo.

Horology
 Mechanical water clock
 In 1433, the scientist Jang Yeong-sil invented an automatic time-annunciating clepsydra called the Striking Palace Clepsydra under an order from Sejong the Great; the uniqueness of the clock was its capability to announce dual-times automatically with both visual and audible signals. Jang developed a signal conversion technique that made it possible to measure analog time and announce digital time simultaneously as well as to separate the water mechanisms from the ball-operated striking mechanisms. The conversion device was called pangmok, and was placed above the inflow vessel that measured the time, the first device of its kind in the world. Thus, the Striking Palace Clepsydra is the first hydro-mechanically engineered dual-time clock in the history of horology.
Braille smartwatch
 The world's first Braille smartwatch, called the Dot, was developed by a Korean startup company. The Dot features a tactile button display and uses Bluetooth to connect to electronic devices.

Military

Traditional

Iron plate armor
 Iron plate armor was used by Silla and Gaya beginning in the early 4th century. According to the Gyeongju National Museum, "The armor excavated from historic sites in Gujeongdong is plate armor, consisting of a number of long iron plates vertically linked with one another, a feature that is unique to armor found on the Korean Peninsula."
Pistol
 The "se-chongtong" was a handheld firearm that was developed in 1432 for use against the Jurchens. It measured 13.8cm, weighed 135g, and was held by a handle that worked like pliers that allowed spent barrels to be replaced with loaded ones. According to the Silok, it was convenient enough to be fired in succession by horsemen carrying multiple barrels, and during times of emergency, even women and children could use it easily.
 Hwacha
 The hwacha is a mobile multiple rocket launcher that uses gunpowder to fire up to 200 singijeon rockets at one time. The hwacha was invented in 1409, but saw its greatest use during the Imjin War, most famously in the Battle of Haengju. Hwachas were used against both land and sea targets.
 Naval artillery
 The Koreans were innovators in the development of naval artillery, and produced the most advanced naval cannons in East Asia. In 1380, 100 Goryeo ships armed with gunpowder weapons destroyed 500 Wokou ships at the Battle of Jinpo.
Armored warship
 The turtle ship, also known as the geobukseon, was the first armored warship in the world. Turtle ships were built during the Joseon dynasty beginning in the early 15th century up until the 19th century, but are most often associated with Admiral Yi Sun-sin, who used them in battle against the Japanese in the Imjin War (1592–1598).
 Bulletproof vest
 The myeonje baegab was a soft bulletproof vest invented in 1867 in the Joseon dynasty.
Thousand paces gun
 The cheonbochong, or the "thousand paces gun", was a type of jochong matchlock musket invented in Joseon during the reign of King Sukjong (1674–1720). Compared to other jochongs of the time that had a range of 120m, the cheonbochong was recorded to have a range of 1200m.
Time bomb
 The pigyok chinchollae, also called the Flying Thunderbolt, was a time bomb with an adjustable fuse mechanism that was invented by Yi Jangson and first used in the Imjin War at the Battle of Gyeongju in 1592. It was projected into enemy camps and formations using the wangu mortar, and also used at sea.
Machine gun
Perhaps the earliest predecessor to the modern machine gun are the chongtong (gun barrel) hwachas of the 15th century. The first of these were created in 1409, in which dozens of stacked rows of bronze gun barrels fired iron bolts. The Moonjong hwacha in 1451 carried 50 gun barrels which each fired sequentially 4 bolts each. The "box" of gun barrels was modular and could be installed and removed on the firing carriage.  The gun-barrel type (as opposed to the rocket type) of hwacha predates the weapons considered the earliest forms of machine guns outside of Korea, the Chinese 'Po-Tzu Lien-Chu-P'ao' or 'string-of-100-bullets cannon' developed in the first quarter of the 17th century. The later jujachongtong hwacha developed in 1490 fired 15 iron bullets per barrel, and hundreds of the weapons were produced and deployed throughout the nation.

Modern
Sentry guard robot
 In 2006, Samsung Techwin released the Samsung SGR-A1, a sentry guard robot designed to replace human counterparts at the Korean Demilitarized Zone. It is the first of its kind to have surveillance, tracking, firing, and voice-recognition systems built into a single unit.
Super aEgis II
 In 2010, DoDaam Systems introduced the Super aEgis II, one of a new breed of automated weapon that can identify, track, and destroy a moving target at a distance of 4 km.
Airburst assault rifle
 Daewoo's K11 is the first gun of its kind to be operational in the field, making the Republic of Korea Army the first in the world to use an airburst assault rifle as standard issue.

Traditional medicine
 Kiln sauna
 The traditional Korean sauna, called the hanjeungmak, is a domed structure constructed of stone that was first mentioned in the Sejong Sillok of the Annals of the Joseon Dynasty in the 15th century. Supported by Sejong the Great, the hanjeungmak was touted for its health benefits and used to treat illnesses. In the early 15th century, Buddhist monks maintained hanjeungmak clinics, called hanjeungso, to treat sick poor people; these clinics maintained separate facilities for men and women due to high demand. Korean sauna culture and kiln saunas are still popular today, and Korean saunas are ubiquitous.
Hand acupuncture
 Koryo hand acupuncture is a modern system of acupuncture, created by Yu Tae-u in the 1970s, in which the hand represents the entire body and is needled or stimulated during treatment. Hand acupuncture is popular among the general population as a form of self-medication in Korea, and has adherents in Japan and North America; it is also popular among overseas Koreans. Korean hand acupuncture is different from American hand reflexology, another form of alternative medicine.
Primo vascular system
 The primo vascular system, also known as the Bong-Han system, is a new circulatory system discovered by Kim Bong-Han, a professor at the Pyongyang Medical University, in 1961. It is differentiated from the arteriovenous and lympathic systems by its unique anatomical and immunohistochemical signature. Originally named the "Substance of Kyungrak", Professor Kim proposed that the system represents the meridians and collaterals of acupuncture. The primo vascular system was scientifically confirmed in 2002.

Ceramics

 Inlaid celadon
 Korean celadon reached its pinnacle with the invention of the sanggam inlay technique in the early 12th century during the Goryeo period.
 Underglaze red
 Jinsa "underglaze red", a technique using copper oxide pigment to create copper-red designs, was developed in Korea during the 12th century, and later inspired the "underglaze red" ceramics of the Yuan dynasty.
 Buncheong
 During the Joseon period, Koreans applied the sanggam tradition to create buncheong ceramics. In contrast to the refined elegance of Goryeo celadon, buncheong is designed to be natural, unassuming, and practical. However, the buncheong tradition was gradually replaced by Joseon white porcelain, its aristocratic counterpart, and disappeared in Korea by the end of the 16th century. Buncheong became known and prized in Japan as Mishima.
 Karatsu
 The Japanese Karatsu style of ceramics originated in Korea.

Music

Musical notation
 Jeongganbo is a unique traditional musical notation system created during the time of Sejong the Great that was the first East Asian system to represent rhythm, pitch, and time.
Janggu
 First depicted in Goguryeo murals, the janggu is the most representative drum in traditional Korean music.
Gayageum
 The most representative traditional instrument of Korea, the gayageum was created in Gaya during the 6th century, and based on the Chinese guzheng.
Pansori
 Originating in the 17th century during the Joseon period, pansori, also known as "Korean folk opera", is a traditional genre of narrative song performed by a sorikkun singer and a gosu drummer. Pansori was inscribed in the Representative List of the Intangible Cultural Heritage of Humanity by UNESCO in 2008.
North Korean instruments
 North Korea has developed many modernized instruments based on traditional instruments. The sohaegeum, junghaegeum, daehaegeum, and jeohaegeum are four-stringed fiddles of varying sizes, based on the traditional haegeum. The eoeungeum is a pear-shaped lute with 5 strings that is similar to the hyangbipa. The cheolhyeongeum and ongnyugeum are modernized zithers, and the jangsaenap is a modernized taepyeongso.
K-pop
 K-pop, or South Korean popular music, began in 1992 with the debut of Seo Taiji and Boys, a band that challenged musical and societal norms in South Korea with music influenced by American genres. Today, K-pop leads the Korean Wave with idol groups such as BTS.

Painting

Chaekgeori
 Chaekgeori, translated as "books and things", is a genre of still-life painting from the Joseon period of Korea that features books as the dominant subject. The chaekgeori tradition flourished from the second half of the 18th century to the first half of the 20th century and was enjoyed by all members of the population, from the king to the commoners, revealing the infatuation with books and learning in Korean culture.
Munjado
 Munjado, also known as "flower writing", is a genre of Korean folk art that enjoyed popularity in the 18th and 19th centuries, in which large Chinese characters associated with Confucian philosophy are painted as a representation of their meaning, with depictions of related stories and themes painted into the characters themselves.

Science

Social science

Double-entry bookkeeping system
 It is believed that the world's first double-entry bookkeeping system, called the sagae chibubeop, was developed in Goryeo and used by merchants in the capital of Kaesong, a center of trade and industry, at least two centuries earlier than in Italy.
Public opinion polling
 In order to provide equality and fairness in taxation for the common people, Sejong the Great issued a royal decree to administer a nationwide public opinion poll regarding a new tax system called Gongbeop in 1430. Over the course of 5 months, the poll surveyed 172,806 people, of which approximately 57% responded with approval for the proposed reform.
Society for the disabled
 The world's first society for the disabled, called the myeongtongsi, was created by the Joseon government during the early Joseon period. The government-organized myeongtongsi regularly held events for the blind to participate in rituals and ceremonies and receive treatment for illnesses, donations of food and other items, and training for certain jobs.
Parental leave
 In 1426, Sejong the Great enacted a law that granted government nobi women 100 days of maternity leave after childbirth, which, in 1430, was lengthened by one month before childbirth. In 1434, Sejong also granted the husbands 30 days of paternity leave.
Silhak
 Silhak, also known as "Practical Learning", is a Korean school of thought developed by the seonbi that is dedicated to an empirical approach to statecraft based on pragmatism, instead of a blind and uncritical adherence to Confucianism. Silhak scholars, such as Jeong Yak-yong, emphasized human equality and advocated economic, educational, and social reform.
Juche
 Juche, translated as "self-reliance" or "self-determination", is the state ideology of North Korea. Implemented in 1956, Juche follows the four principles of "autonomy in ideology, independence in politics, self-sufficiency in economy, and self-reliance in defense".
Blue Ocean Strategy
 The blue ocean strategy was developed by W. Chan Kim and Renée Mauborgne, who argue that companies can succeed not by battling competitors, but rather by creating ″blue oceans″ of uncontested market space.
U-City
 U-City (ubiquitous city) is defined as a "next generation urban space" that includes an integrated set of ubiquitous services: a convergent form of both physical and online spaces. Songdo in South Korea is the first U-City in the world.

Physical science
Vinylon
 In 1939, vinylon, the second man-made fiber to be invented, after nylon, was developed by Ichiro Sakurada, Ri Sung-gi, and Hiroshi Kawakami at Kyoto University in Japan. However, the fiber was largely ignored until Ri Sung-gi defected to North Korea in 1950 and led its production. Vinylon is the national fiber of North Korea, and is used for the majority of textiles, outstripping fibers such as cotton or nylon.
Positron emission tomography
 Zang-Hee Cho and James Roberston were the first to propose a ring system that has become the prototype of the current shape of PET. Zang-Hee Cho also developed the first PET-MRI fusion molecular imaging device for neuro-molecular imaging.
Invisible axion
 The invisible axion was first originally proposed by the theoretical physicist Kim Jihn Eui.
Brown-Rho scaling
 In 1991, Mannque Rho and Gerald E. Brown introduced Brown-Rho scaling, which predicts how hadronic masses scale in a dense medium.
Holotomography
 Researchers at KAIST developed the HT-1, a next-generation holographic microscope for 3D live cell imaging without the need for staining or labeling. The HT-1 is the first system to achieve high-resolution tomographic microscopy with full optical/electronic control, and do so without having a mechanical rotation system.
Color charge
 In 1965, Moo-Young Han and Yoichiro Nambu first introduced a new hidden symmetry among quarks, which is the origin of what is now called the color SU(3) symmetry.
Lee-Weinberg bound
 In 1977, Benjamin W. Lee and Steven Weinberg introduced the Lee-Weinberg bound, about the cosmological lower bound on heavy neutrino masses.
Computational materials physics
 In 1979, Ihm Jisoon first introduced a new field in condensed matter physics, called computational materials physics.
Supersolid
 In 2004, Eunseong Kim and Moses H. W. Chan discovered the first evidence of a superfluidlike state in solid helium.
Graphene
 In 2005, Philip Kim and Andre Geim's groups independently demonstrated peculiar and outstanding properties of graphene, leading to an explosion of interest in graphene. In his Nobel lecture in 2010, Andre Geim said, "I owe Philip a great deal for this, and many people heard me saying – before and after the Nobel Prize – that I would be honoured to share it with him." In 2009, Hong Byung-hee pioneered the synthesis of large-scale graphene by chemical vapor deposition, which triggered chemical researches toward the practical applications of graphene.
Gravitational microlensing
 In 1979, Kyongae Chang and Sjur Refsdal pointed out that a single star (a 'microlens') in a lens galaxy can cause flux variations on time scales of a year, leading to the Chang-Refsdal lens.
Diversity oriented fluorescence library approach
 Young-Tae Chang pioneered the diversity oriented fluorescence library approach (DOFLA) using a fluorescent library, allowing clear imaging of pancreatic cells.
Nano 3D printing
 Seung Kwon Seol's team at the Korea Electrotechnology Research Institute used a new 3D printing technique to demonstrate for the first time 3D printed nanostructures composed entirely of graphene.
FINEX
 POSCO and Siemens VAI developed a new iron-making technology called FINEX in which molten iron is produced directly using iron ore fines and non-coking coal rather than traditional blast furnace methods through sintering and reduction with coke. 
Smart prosthetic skin
 Researchers at Seoul National University developed a "smart prosthetic skin" that can sense pressure, heat, and moisture.
Giga steel
 Giga steel is a type of steel developed by POSCO that can withstand over 100 kilograms per square millimeter, and is said to be "as light as aluminum but almost three times stronger," according to the company CEO.

Life science
Triangle of U
 In 1935, the Korean-Japanese plant scientist Woo Jang-choon proposed the Triangle of U, named after himself, which describes the evolution and relationships between members of the plant genus Brassica.
Hantavirus
 Hantaan, the prototype hantavirus, was first isolated by Ho Wang Lee and Karl M. Johnson in 1978, and the first hantavirus vaccine to protect against hantavirus hemorrhagic fever with renal syndrome was developed in Korea in 1990.
Cloned dog
 The world's first cloned dog, Snuppy the Afghan hound, was cloned at Seoul National University and born in 2005. Snuppy was also used in the first successful breeding between cloned canines.
Preventive HIV vaccine
 Chil-Yong Kang and his team at Western University developed the first genetically modified, whole-killed HIV vaccine to be approved for testing in humans, called the SAV001-H.
Nanomedicine
 Cheon Jinwoo of Yonsei University demonstrated, for the first time, the nanoscale size-dependent MRI contrast effect, opening a new gateway to "nanomedicine", and also introduced the world’s most advanced nano-MRI technology, MEIO (magnetism-engineered iron oxide).
Stent implantation of left main coronary artery stenosis
 Park Seung-jung pioneered a new method using a stent as an alternative treatment for left main coronary artery stenosis, an abnormal narrowing of the aortic valve in the heart.
Video-assisted minilaparotomy surgery
 Koon Ho Rha and Seung Choul Yang at Yonsei University invented video-assisted minilaparotomy surgery (VAMS), a hybridized form of laparoscopic and open surgeries.
Percutaneous endoscopic cervical discectomy
 Sang-Ho Lee of Wooridul Spine Hospital pioneered percutaneous endoscopic cervical discectomy, which is the first laser-assisted endoscopic technique for herniated disc surgery.
Pharmaceutical drugs
Gemifloxacin is a fluoroquinolone antibiotic developed by LG Life Sciences that is used in the treatment of acute bacterial exacerbation of chronic bronchitis and mild-to-moderate pneumonia.
Balofloxacin is an orally active fluoroquinolone antibiotic developed by Choongwae Pharma for the treatment of urinary tract infections.
Tedizolid is an oxazolidinone antibiotic developed by Dong-A ST, the specialty pharmaceuticals arm of Dong-A Socio Holdings, to treat patients with acute bacterial skin and skin structure infections.
Gemigliptin is a dipeptidyl peptidase-4 inhibitor developed by LG Life Sciences to treat hyperglycemia in patients with type 2 diabetes mellitus.
Evogliptin is a dipeptidyl peptidase-4 inhibitor developed by Dong-A ST.
Fimasartan is a non-peptide angiotensin II receptor antagonist developed by Boryung Pharmaceutical to treat hypertension and heart failure.
Radotinib is a drug for the treatment of chronic myeloid leukemia, developed by Ilyang Pharmaceutical.
Zabofloxacin is an investigational fluoroquinolone antibiotic to treat multidrug-resistant infections due to gram-positive bacteria. It was discovered by Dong Wha Pharmaceuticals and licensed to Pacific Beach BioSciences for development.
Udenafil is a PDE5 inhibitor developed by Dong-A Pharmaceutical to treat erectile dysfunction.
Polmacoxib is a nonsteroidal anti-inflammatory drug developed by CrystalGenomics to treat osteoarthritis.
Ilaprazole is a proton pump inhibitor developed by Ilyang Pharmaceutical to treat dyspepsia, peptic ulcer disease, gastroesophageal reflux disease, and duodenal ulcer.

Technology

Electronics
Metal-oxide-semiconductor field-effect transistor (MOSFET)
 In 1959, Dawon Kahng and Mohamed Atalla at Bell Labs invented the metal–oxide–semiconductor field-effect transistor (MOSFET), a semiconductor that is the basic element in most of today's electronic equipment. It is the basic building block of the Digital Revolution, and the most widely manufactured device in history.
Floating-gate MOSFET (FGMOS)
In 1967, Dawon Kahng and Simon Min Sze invented the floating-gate MOSFET, which provides the foundation for many forms of semiconductor memory devices.
Synchronous dynamic random-access memory (SDRAM)
The first commercial synchronous dynamic random-access memory (SDRAM) was the Samsung KM48SL2000 memory chip. It was introduced by Samsung Electronics in 1992, and mass-produced in 1993.
Double-data rate SDRAM (DDR SDRAM)
First demonstrated by Samsung in 1997. Samsung released the first commercial DDR SDRAM chip in June 1998.

MP3 player
 The world's first commercially available MP3 player, the MPMan, was launched by SaeHan Information Systems in 1997.
Graphics DDR SDRAM (GDDR SDRAM)
 GDDR was initially known as DDR SGRAM (double data-rate synchronous graphics RAM). It was commercially introduced by Samsung Electronics in 1998.
MP3 phone
 The first mobile phone to support MP3 playback, the SPH-M2100, was released by Samsung in 1999.
TV phone
 The world's first TV phone, the SCH-M220, was developed by Samsung in 1999.
Tablet computer
 The first commercially available tablet computer, the GRiDPad, was manufactured by Samsung in 1989 after it absorbed GRiD Systems Corporation in 1988. The GRiDPad was modified from the Samsung PenMaster, which was never commercially released.
Watch phone
 The world's first watch phone, the SPH-WP10, was released by Samsung in 1999.
Curved display smartphone
 The world's first curved display smartphone, the Samsung Galaxy Round, was released by Samsung on 10 October 2013.
EyeCan
 Samsung developed the first eye tracking mouse that doesn't require users to wear special equipment, called the EyeCan, in 2012.
Touchscreen phone
 The LG Prada is the world's first completely touchscreen mobile phone, and also the first mobile phone with a capacitive touchscreen.
5G smartphone
 Samsung released the world's first 5G smartphone, the Galaxy S10 5G, in 2019.
LTE mobile phone
 Samsung released the world's first LTE mobile phone, the SCH-r900, in 2010, and the world's first LTE smartphone, the Samsung Galaxy Indulge, in 2011.
Retina display
 Apple's "Retina" display was invented by LG and bought by Apple.
3D hologram
 The world's first 360-degree color hologram was developed by the Electronics and Telecommunications Research Institute in 2015.
Universal Flash Storage
 The world's first UFS memory cards were developed by Samsung.
Rollable keyboard
 The world's first solid rollable keyboard was introduced by LG in 2015.
Flexible battery
 In 2012, researchers at KAIST demonstrated the first fully functional all-flexible electronic battery system. In 2013, scientists led by Professor Lee Sang-young of Ulsan National Institute of Science and Technology developed the world's first bendable lithium ion batteries.
High Bandwidth Memory
 High Bandwidth Memory is a high-performance RAM interface for 3D-stacked DRAM developed by SK Hynix and AMD to be used in conjunction with high-performance graphics accelerators and network devices.
Wearable thermoelectric generator
 Researchers led by Byung Jin Cho at KAIST developed a glass fabric-based thermoelectric (TE) generator that is extremely light and flexible and produces electricity from the heat of the human body.
Transparent resistive random access memory
 Transparent resistive random access memory (TRRAM) is the world's first transparent computer chip, invented by scientists at KAIST.
Online electric vehicle
 Researchers at KAIST developed an electric transportation system in which online electric vehicles (OLEV) get power wirelessly through the application of shaped magnetic field in resonance, a new technology introduced by KAIST that enables electric vehicles to transfer electricity wirelessly from the road surface. The world's first OLEV buses began operation at the city of Gumi in March 2014.
3D nanoprinting pen
 The first pen that performs 3D printing on the nanoscale was developed by Seongpil Hwang of Korea University in 2014.

Appliances
Digital refrigerator
 In 2000, LG Electronics introduced the world's first digital refrigerator called the Internet Digital DIOS.
Steam closet
 In 2011, LG introduced a closet, called the Styler, that steam cleans clothing that's hung inside without the use of water or detergents; it is used in hotels, airports, casinos, and homes in Korea.
Wall-mounted drum type washing machine
 In 2012, Dongbu Daewoo Electronics introduced the world’s first wall-mounted drum type washing machine called the "Mini".
Dual washing machine
 In 2015, LG Electronics unveiled the world's first washing machine that allows for two separate loads to be washed simultaneously using the "TWIN Wash System".
Kimchi refrigerator
 The kimchi refrigerator is designed to meet the storage requirements of kimchi. The first commercial kimchi refrigerator was created by Winia Mando in 1995.
Steam mop
 Invented by Romi Haan in 2001, the steam mop is a type of electric mop that uses hot steam to disinfect floors.

Information technology
Contactless smart card
 Beginning in 1995, Seoul was the first city in the world to use contactless smart cards, for electronic ticketing.
WiBro
 Developed in 2005 by Samsung Electronics, WiBro, an abbreviation of wireless broadband, is the first commercial mobile WiMax system in the world. In April 2007, KT began full commercial WiBro services in the Seoul metropolitan area and its vicinity for the first time in the world.
Digital multimedia broadcasting
 The digital multimedia broadcasting technology was developed in South Korea. It is a digital transmission system for sending multimedia to mobile devices.
Mobile television service
 By developing digital multimedia broadcasting (DMB), Korea became the first nation in the world to officially introduce mobile television service in May 2005.
Virtual store
 In 2011, Homeplus launched the world's first virtual store at Seolleung Station, enabling consumers to purchase items with their smartphones by scanning QR codes using the Homeplus app, then having the products delivered.
Caller ringback tone
 The caller ringback tone (CRBT) service, which allows subscribers to choose a piece of music or an audio clip that callers will hear in place of the standard 'ringing' tone when dialing the subscriber's number, was first offered in South Korea in 2002 by SK Telecom. It was developed in 2001 by the Korean firm Witcom.
Electronic promissory note
 In 2005, the Korean Ministry of Justice and a consortium of financial institutions announced the service of an electronic promissory note service, after years of development, allowing entities to make promissory notes (notes payable) in business transactions digitally instead of on paper, for the first time in the world.
5G
In April 2019 Korea released the world's first 5G network, becoming the first country in the world to adopt 5G.

Robotics

HUBO
 Developed by KAIST and introduced in 2004, HUBO is the world's second walking humanoid robot, and the first to move with a natural gait.
EveR-1
 Developed by a team at the Korea Institute of Industrial Technology and introduced in May 2003, EveR-1 is the world's second android.
Albert HUBO
 Introduced in 2005, Albert HUBO is the world’s first walking humanoid robot with an android head. It was a collaboration between Hanson Robotics and KAIST.
MAHRU
 Developed by a team at Korea Institute of Science and Technology and introduced in March 2005, MAHRU (originally known as NBH-1) is the first network-based humanoid robot in the world.
Robot prison guard
 In 2011, the world's first robot prison guard was introduced. Developed by Lee Baik-chul, a professor at Kyonggi University, the robot prison guard uses 3D cameras to detect abnormal human behavior patterns.
Manned bipedal robot
 South Korea's Method-2 is the world's first manned bipedal robot.
Ciliary microrobot
 Hongsoo Choi's research team at the Daegu Gyeongbuk Institute of Science and Technology developed the world's first ciliary microrobots, that can move and function like single cells.
Cancer-fighting nanobot
 Scientists at the Chonnam National University in South Korea developed the world's first cancer-fighting nanobot, a microscopic robot called a "bacteriobot", that is injected into the bloodstream and seeks out and destroys cancer cells while leaving healthy cells alone.
Robotic thyroidectomy
 Robot-assisted transaxillary thyroid surgery (RATS), also called robotic thyroidectomy (RT), is a minimally invasive surgical technique developed in Korea that can remove all or part of the thyroid without scarring the neck.

Entertainment technology
4DX
 Developed by South Korean conglomerate CJ Group in 2009, 4DX is the world's first 4D cinema technology, allowing a motion picture presentation to be augmented with environmental effects.
ScreenX
 Developed by South Korean conglomerate CJ Group in 2012, ScreenX is the world’s first multi-projection system. It extends the images onto the theater walls to provide a 270-degree viewing environment.
Cinema LED screen
 The world's first commercial cinema LED screen was developed by Samsung Electronics and installed in the Super S auditorium at the Lotte World Tower in Seoul. The screen is 10.3 meters wide and runs at 4K resolution, with brightness "ten times greater than that offered by standard projector technologies," according to Samsung. In 2018, Samsung debuted the world’s first 3D cinema LED screen.

Internet
Internet café
 In 1988, an archaic type of cybercafé called the "Electronic Café" was opened in front of Hongik University in Seoul, South Korea by Ahn Sangsu and Keum Nuri. It had two 16-bit computers connected to an online service provider through a telephone line. The first modern Internet café in Korea was opened in 1994. Korean Internet cafés, called PC bangs, are also LAN gaming centers, and boomed during the late 1990s thanks to the growth of the Internet and gaming cultures.
MMORPG
 Nexus: The Kingdom of the Winds was released by Nexon on 5 April 1996, making it one of the earliest graphical MMORPGs in the world.
Question-and-answer platform
 Naver, the leading search portal in South Korea, pioneered a real-time community-driven question-and-answer platform called Knowledge Search in 2002. In 2005, Yahoo! launched Yahoo! Answers, which was modeled, in part, on Naver's Knowledge Search.

Loot box
The first known instance of a loot box system is believed to be an item called "Gachapon ticket" which was introduced in the Japanese version of MapleStory, a side-scrolling MMORPG, in June 2004. Such tickets were sold at the price of 100 Japanese yen per ticket. Like real-life gachapon machines, players attained randomly chosen game items when they used the ticket on "Gachapon", an in-game booth that was distributed across the game world. 
National intranet
 North Korea's Kwangmyong is generally considered the first national intranet, launched in 2000.
eSports
 The first eSports league in the field of online gaming started in Korea in 1997. In December 1997, PC bang chains opened the first national online gaming league, known as the "Korea Pro Gamers League". The term "eSports" was coined by Park Ji-won of the Ministry of Culture, Sports and Tourism in February 2000 when he inaugurated the Korea e-Sports Association. OGN was the first online game specialty channel in the world, and opened the world's first eSports dedicated stadium.
Social networking service
 South Korea's Cyworld is the world's first mass social networking service. It was also the first in the world to have individual home pages and automated systems for contacting friends and relatives, leading to the creation of other popular sites such as Facebook and Myspace.
Free-to-play
 The free-to-play business model in online games was created by Nexon in Korea. The first game to use it was Nexon's QuizQuiz, released in October 1999, and made by Lee Seungchan, who would go on to create MapleStory.
Webtoon
 In 2003, Daum launched the "Webtoon" digital platform, creating a new form of manhwa (comics) that utilizes major characteristics of digital technologies. According to the Korea Creative Content Agency, "Webtoons are not simply scanned versions of print comics. It’s a whole new, different genre tailored for the Internet age."
Mukbang
 Mukbang, also called "eating broadcast" or "social eating", is a type of online broadcast in which the host eats while interacting with online viewers. The mukbang Internet culture began on AfreecaTV in 2009.
Citizen journalism
 Launched in 2000, OhmyNews is the world's first online newspaper to publish reports by readers, or "citizen journalists", allowing civil participation in opposition of the conservative press. OhmyNews influenced the outcome of the 2002 South Korean presidential election, and is considered one of the country's most influential media outlets.
Stickers
 Developed by Naver for its LINE instant messaging app in Japan, stickers are large detailed emoticons featuring popular characters and themes. The original default characters and stickers, known as the LINE Friends, were created by Kang Byeongmok, also known as "Mogi", in 2011.
Offline cryptocurrency exchange
 Coinone, a Korean digital currency exchange company, opened a brick-and-mortar branch called Coinone Blocks that it claims is the world's first brick-and-mortar cryptocurrency trading floor.
Ad supported Online video platform
Founded in October 2004, Pandora TV is the first video sharing website in the world to attach advertisement to user-submitted video clips and to provide unlimited storage space for users to upload.
Live Streaming Platform
The earliest live streaming platform known outside of Korea was Livestream, launched in 2007. However, AfreecaTV was launched in 2005 making it the first live streaming platform in the world.

Traditional games

Yut
 Yut is an ancient Korean board game that is still played to this day, especially on Seollal.
Polyhedral dice
 Juryeonggu is a 14-sided die invented in the Later Silla period that was used in drinking games.
Tujeon
 Tujeon is a traditional card game, originally based on Madiao, that is played with long rectangular numbered cards. It gradually became linked to gambling.
Seunggyeongdo
 Seunggyeongdo is a traditional board game attributed to Ha Ryun that simulates climbing the Joseon government career ladder and reaching the top by the end.
Seongbuldo
 Seongbuldo is a traditional board game dating back to the Goryeo period that simulates the path to becoming a Buddha. It is still played by Buddhists in Korea.

Martial arts

Taekkyeon
 It is believed that taekkyeon originated from subak (手搏), based on the encyclopedia Manmulbo published in 1798. Taekkyeon almost disappeared during the 20th century but made a resurgence in modern times, and was inscribed in the Representative List of the Intangible Cultural Heritage of Humanity of UNESCO in 2011.
Ssireum
 The earliest evidence of ssireum, or "Korean wrestling", dates back to the Goguryeo period. Originally used in military applications, ssireum became a popular pastime of the people, including many Korean kings, during the Goryeo and Joseon periods. In the 20th century, ssireum became a nationally televised sport in South Korea.
Gukgung
 Gukgung, also known as gungsul, is traditional Korean archery that makes use of the gakgung, the traditional Korean composite bow made of horn.

Sports
Jokgu
 Inspired by the Southeast Asian sport sepak takraw, jokgu is a modern sport invented in 1960 by members of the Republic of Korea Air Force's 11th Fighter Wing that combines aspects of football and volleyball.
Jangchigi
 Jangchigi, originally called dobogyeokdo, is a traditional hockey-like sport that dates back to the Three Kingdoms period. It is related to masanggyeokgu, a traditional polo-like sport that also dates back to the Three Kingdoms period.
Taekwondo
 Created in 1955, taekwondo has become the national sport of South Korea and an official Olympic sport since the 2000 Summer Olympics. Taekwondo is based on taekkyeon and Shotokan karate.

Products
Italy towel
 The Korean exfoliating mitt is a mass-produced bath product used to scrub and peel the outermost layer of skin; it was invented in Busan by Kim Pil-gon in 1962. Since then, the Italy towel has become a household item in Korean homes and a staple item in Korean saunas. The Korean exfoliating mitt was named the Italy towel because the viscose fabric used to make it was imported from Italy at the time.
Gable top
 Gable tops were invented by Dr. Shin Seok-kyun in 1953 allowing for milk cartons to be sealed tight after opening for later use. Dr. Shin Seok-kyun, so-called Edison of Korea, unfortunately he couldn’t file  his patent given the turbulent context in the middle of Korean War. Eventually, this gable top carton made its way into the U.S. by U.S. army and was set as the international standard.These days, gable top cartons are used all around the world.
Electrically heated stone bed
 The dol bed, or stone bed, is a manufactured bed that has the same heating effect as ondol and is purported to have health benefits. The dol bed industry is estimated to be worth 100 billion Korean won, comprising 30 to 40 percent of the entire bed industry in South Korea; dol beds are most popular with middle-aged people in their 40s and 50s.
Circle contact lens
 Special cosmetic contact lenses popular in Asia that make the eye's iris appear larger in different shades. This product was invented in South Korea.
Sheet Mask
Sheet masks are face-shaped sheet fabrics soaked in nutrition-packed solution called serum, used as skincare and beauty product originated in Korea.

Miscellaneous

Thundersticks
 Thundersticks, known as makdae pungseon in Korea, are inflatable plastic promotional noisemakers that are most often used at sporting events, political rallies, and concerts. Makdae pungseon were created by BalloonStix Korea and first used in 1994 at an LG Twins baseball game.
Jige
 The jige, also known as the A-frame carrier, is a traditional Korean wooden device for carrying heavy loads, that is adapted to Korea's rough mountainous terrain. The jige was adopted by United Nations troops during the Korean War.
 Knowledge Industrial Center (Apartment-Type Factory)
The apartment-type factory (아파트형 공장) is legally defined as having 3 or more floors and accommodating 6 or more factories in the same building. The apartment-type factory was formed in order to solve industrial structure changes and offshoring of plants due to the rise of land value. The first apartment type-factory, Incheon Juan Apartment type factory were generated in 1989. In 2010, the term "apartment-style factory" was changed to "knowledge industrial center"(지식산업센터). Unlike traditional smokestack factories, the semi-industrial district knowledge industrial center makes efficient use of land and blends ICT, knowledge, and manufacturing industries into one building, creating a co-support system for medium sized businesses. Modern knowledge industrial centers have door-to-door interior hallways for vehicles and drive-in systems in multiple floors for truck loading, as well as special attention to quality employee experience through beautification and communal recreation. This type of factory has also been spread outside of Korea, such as Vietnam.
Ice-breaking LNG carrier
The world's first ice-breaking LNG tanker was developed by DSME in 2016, and such ships have been instrumental to transporting natural gas from the arctic regions, where the environment made it very difficult in the past.
Drive-through COVID-19 testing
South Korea pioneered the coronavirus drive-through testing system in the city of Goyang in 2020, during the middle of the COVID-19 Pandemic.

See also
History of science and technology in Korea
History of typography in East Asia
List of Chinese inventions
List of Chinese discoveries
List of Japanese inventions and discoveries
List of Taiwanese inventions and discoveries
List of Singaporean inventions and discoveries
List of Vietnamese inventions and discoveries

References

External links
 Guide to Korean Culture 2016

Inventions and innovations
Korean